Wieviorka is a surname. Notable people with the surname include: 

Annette Wieviorka (born 1948), French historian
Michel Wieviorka (born 1946), French sociologist
Olivier Wieviorka (born 1960), French historian
Sylvie Wieviorka (born 1950), French psychiatrist, academic, and politician